Sangaste is a small borough in Otepää Parish, Valga County, southern Estonia. Sangaste has a population of 228 (as of 1 January 2010).

Sangaste castle
Sangaste castle or manor traces its history to at least 1522, when it was part of the estates of the bishop of Tartu. The current building was built in 1879-1883 and designed by architect Otto Pius Hippius. It is built in a neo-Gothic style with influences from Tudor architecture,  and considered one of the  most impressive examples of Gothic Revival architecture in the Baltic States. Several original interior details have been preserved to this day. The manor house was unusually modern for its time, equipped with central heating, telephones in 1896, and electric light in 1907.

According to legend, it owes its existence to an insult the local count Friedrich Georg Magnus von Berg received in his youth. When attempting to wed a young English lady, her father objected to giving his daughter away to "some Russian savage". Nowadays the castle is administratively located in the nearby Lossiküla village.

Gallery

Notable people
Friedrich Wilhelm Rembert von Berg (1793–1874), Baltic German Field Marshal, the Governor-General of Finland and notable for his role in the Russification of Poland; was born in Sangaste Castle
August Gailit (1891–1960), writer; was born in Kuiksilla, near the Sangaste Castle
Aarne Viisimaa (1898–1989), operatic tenor and opera director

References

External links

Sangaste Parish 
Sangaste Castle

Boroughs and small boroughs in Estonia
Manor houses in Estonia
Kreis Dorpat